Strait Up is the second studio album by the American nu metal band Snot, released on November 7, 2000. The album features appearances by various alternative metal musicians. The album was released as a tribute to Snot's lead singer Lynn Strait, who was killed in a car accident on December 11, 1998.

Reception

The album peaked at No. 56 on the Billboard 200. CMJ  called the album "A vivid cross section of nu-metal styles". Melody Maker gave the album 4 stars out of 5 and said that "The riffs are diamond hard and magnificently driven... the best of the band is found in their quieter moments." It won a 2000 Metal Edge Readers' Choice Award for Hits/Compilation/Live Album of the Year.

Track listing

Personnel
Credits adapted from album’s liner notes.

Snot
Lynn Strait – vocals , spoken word 
Mike Doling – guitars , additional vocals 
Sonny Mayo – guitars , programming 
John Fahnestock – bass , additional vocals 
Jamie Miller – drums 

Guest musicians
Brandon Boyd – vocals 
Max Cavalera – vocals 
Mike "Mad Dog" Combs – additional guitars 
Nathan Cox – additional vocals 
Whitfield Crane – additional vocals 
Jonathan Davis – vocals 
Marcello Dias – additional bass 
Fred Durst – vocals 
Aimee Echo – additional vocals 
Klaus Eichstad – additional guitars 
Dez Fafara – vocals 
Stan Frasier – additional vocals 
Jared "M.C.U.D." Gomes – vocals 
Shannon Larkin – drums 
Clint Lowery – guitar and vocals 
Mark McGrath – vocals 
Shavo Odadjian – additional bass 
Ozzy Osbourne – spoken word 
DJ Product – turntables 
Morgan Rose – drums 
Jason Sears – vocals 
Serj Tankian – vocals 
Corey Taylor – vocals 
Jim Wirt – strings , Hammond organ , piano 
Lajon Witherspoon – vocals 

Production
Nic Adler – executive producer
Andrew Alekel – additional engineering
Stefan Broadley – Pro Tools, programming
Terry Date – vocal engineer 
Mike Doling – producer 
John Fahnestock – producer , art concept
Diane Gallemore – front cover photo
Sean Henning – executive producer
Dave Holdridge – Pro Tools
Donat Kazarinoff – engineer , pro-tools, programming
Marek – assistant mix engineer
Steve Piper – Pro Tools
Justin Risley – Pro Tools
Ross Robinson – producer 
Wendy Sherman – art direction and design
Happy Walters – co-executive producer
Rick Will – mixing
Jim Wirt – producer and engineer

References

2000 albums
Snot (band) albums
Tribute albums
Immortal Records albums